Umm Haratayn (also spelled Umm Hartein) is a village in southern Syria, administratively part of the al-Suwayda Governorate, located north of al-Suwayda. Nearby localities include al-Hirak, Khirbet Ghazaleh and Da'el to the west and Umm Walad and Bosra to the south. According to the Syria Central Bureau of Statistics (CBS), Umm Haratayn had a population of 574 in the 2004 census.

Modern-day Umm Haratayn was established by Druze migrants led by the Halabi family between 1867 and 1883. The village is the birthplace of Arab singer Samira Tewfik.

References

Bibliography

External links
 Map of town, Google Maps

19th-century establishments in the Ottoman Empire
Druze communities in Syria
Populated places in Shahba District
Villages in Syria